Mount Muir is a mountain located in the Malahat Land District, Vancouver Island, British Columbia.

References

Mountains of British Columbia under 1000 metres